Kanes Sucharitakul (born February 13, 1992, in Bangkok) is an alpine skier from Thailand. He competed for Thailand at the 2014 Winter Olympics in the slalom and giant slalom.
He was Thailand's flag bearer at the opening ceremony of the 2014 Olympic Winter Games in Sochi.

See also 
Thailand at the 2014 Winter Olympics
Prawat Nagvajara, first Thai Winter Olympian, Thai cross-country skier

References

External links 
 FIS (International Ski Federation) SUCHARITAKUL Kanes (900001)

1992 births
Living people
Kanes Sucharitakul
Kanes Sucharitakul
Alpine skiers at the 2014 Winter Olympics
People educated at Eton College
Alumni of Robinson College, Cambridge
Kanes Sucharitakul